Leonore is a village in LaSalle County, Illinois, United States. The population was 121 at the 2020 census. It is part of the Ottawa Micropolitan Statistical Area.

History 
Leonore was originally established as Gary in the late 1880s to serve as a station on the Illinois Valley & Northern Railroad. In 1889, the name of the station was changed as there was already a post office named Gary. Leonore was deemed the favorite of the suggested names. Leonore was incorporated as a village on April 20, 1891; this was certified on June 15th, 1891.

Leonore is known locally as the site of a bank robbery.

Geography
Leonore is located in southern LaSalle County at  (41.189377, -88.981384).

Demographics

As of the census of 2020, there were 121 people, 64 households, and 29 families residing in the village. The racial makeup of the village was 92.6% White, 1.6% from other races, and 5.8% from two or more races. Hispanic or Latino of any race were 0.03% of the population.

There were 64 households, out of which 14.1% had children under the age of 18 living with them, 45.3% were married couples living together, and 64.8% were non-families. 54.7% of all households were made up of individuals, and 39.1% had someone living alone who was 65 years of age or older. The average household size was 2.11 and the average family size was 3.45.

In the village, the population was spread out, with 17.0% under the age of 18, 12.6% from 18 to 24, 16.5% from 25 to 44, 34.7% from 45 to 64, and 24.4% who were 65 years of age or older. The median age was 47.4 years. For every 100 females, there were 107.7 males. For every 100 females age 18 and over, there were 119.6 males.

The median income for a household in the village was $68,428, and the median income for a family was $145,288. Males had a median income of $70,625 versus $21,923 for females. The per capita income for the village was $31,701. There were no families and 11.1% of the population living below the poverty line, including no under eighteens and 39.4% of those over 65.

References

Villages in Illinois
Ottawa, IL Micropolitan Statistical Area
Villages in LaSalle County, Illinois